Great Geneva is a historic home located near Camden, Kent County, Delaware. It was built in about 1765, and is a -story, brick, hall-and-parlor plan dwelling with a small frame kitchen wing. The layout is an adaptation of the Resurrection Manor plan. It is associated with the prominent Hunn family and the local Quaker community. The house was an important station on the Underground Railroad.

It was added to the National Register of Historic Places in 1973.

References

External links 

Houses on the Underground Railroad
Historic American Buildings Survey in Delaware
Houses on the National Register of Historic Places in Delaware
Houses completed in 1765
Houses in Kent County, Delaware
National Register of Historic Places in Kent County, Delaware